The 1962 NCAA University Division basketball tournament involved 25 schools playing in single-elimination play to determine the national champion of men's NCAA Division I college basketball in the United States. It began on March 12, 1962, and ended with the championship game on March 24 in Louisville, Kentucky. A total of 29 games were played, including a third-place game in each region and a national third-place game, which was won by Wake Forest.

For the second consecutive season, Cincinnati, coached by Ed Jucker, played Ohio State, coached by Fred Taylor, in the final game. Cincinnati won the national title with a 71–59 victory over Ohio State. Paul Hogue of Cincinnati was named the tournament's Most Outstanding Player.

The total attendance for the tournament was 177,469, a new record.

Locations

The tournament returned to Louisville's Freedom Hall for its second two-year run as host of the Final Four. The 1962 tournament was the first in the 14-year history of the tournament in which all the host venues were either on campus or, in the case of Freedom Hall, the primary off-campus home venue. This would be the case seven times over the following 10 years. Only one new venue was used for this tournament. For the first time ever, the state of Maryland and the Washington metropolitan area hosted games, at Cole Field House on the campus of University of Maryland, College Park. The tournament would be played there 10 times, most famously hosting the 1966 and 1970 Final Fours. All nine arenas used would see action again in future tournaments.

Teams

Bracket
* – Denotes overtime period

East region

Mideast region

Midwest region

West region

Final Four

National Third-Place Game

Regional Third-Place Games

See also
 1962 NCAA College Division basketball tournament
 1962 National Invitation Tournament
 1962 NAIA Division I men's basketball tournament

References

NCAA Division I men's basketball tournament
Ncaa
Sports in Corvallis, Oregon
Basketball competitions in Louisville, Kentucky
NCAA University Division basketball tournament
NCAA University Division basketball tournament
Basketball in the Dallas–Fort Worth metroplex